"Blow Me Away" is a song by American rock band Breaking Benjamin. The song is a non-album single because it was written in 2004 specifically for the Halo 2 Original Soundtrack. It was later released in 2010 as a digital single. In 2011, a remixed version of the song was released on Shallow Bay: The Best of Breaking Benjamin, featuring vocals of Sydnee Duran from Valora. Written by vocalist and guitarist Benjamin Burnley and then-drummer Jeremy Hummel, the song is described as featuring "hard rock roots, ... a vocal-centric aesthetic, heavy electric rhythm guitars", and "an aggressive male vocalist".

Track listing

Controversy
When drummer Jeremy Hummel filed a federal wrongful termination lawsuit against the band, he contended that he co-wrote the song. In March 2010, it was announced that Hollywood Records was seeking the band's permission to produce the remix with additional vocals from Sydnee Duran of Valora. In May 2011, while the band was on hiatus due to Burnley's health issues, guitarist Aaron Fink and bassist Mark Klepaski gave the label permission to remix the song after being offered money. Burnley fired both two days later. In June, Burnley filed a lawsuit against Fink and Klepaski, seeking at least $750,000 in damages and the exclusive right to the band's name. He claimed that both members had made unilateral and unauthorized decisions on behalf of the band, though both of them denied these claims. On April 19, 2013, Burnley announced that the dispute between him and the other members had been resolved and that he retained the right to continue the band under the name Breaking Benjamin.

Charts

Certfications

Personnel
 "Blow Me Away"
 Performed by Breaking Benjamin
 Benjamin Burnley – vocals, rhythm guitar
 Aaron Fink – lead guitar
 Mark Klepaski – bass
 Jeremy Hummel – drums
 Written by Benjamin Burnley and Jeremy Hummel
 Produced and mixed by David Bendeth
 Digital editing by Dan Korneff
 Recorded at Blackbird Studios, Nashville, Tennessee

 "Blow Me Away" 
 Written by Benjamin Burnley and Jeremy Hummel
 Produced and mixed by David Bendeth
 Mix engineering by Dan Korneff
 Engineering and digital editing by Dan Korneff and John Bender
 Recorded at House of Loud, Elmwood Park, New Jersey
 Mastered by Ted Jensen at Sterling Sound, New York City, New York
 Additional vocals by Sydnee Duran of Valora

References

2010 singles
2011 singles
Breaking Benjamin songs
Hollywood Records singles
2004 songs
Songs written by Benjamin Burnley